Bogdan Radivojević (born 2 March 1993) is a Serbian handball player for SC Pick Szeged and the Serbian national team.

Club career
Radivojević made his senior debut for Partizan in the 2010–11 season, as the team won the league title. He later moved abroad to Germany and signed with SG Flensburg-Handewitt, helping the club win the 2013–14 EHF Champions League.

International career
A Serbia international since 2012, Radivojević participated in two World Championships (2013 and 2019) and three European Championships (2014, 2018 and 2020).

Personal life 
His parter is Jelena Despotovic handball player. Their daughter was born in August 2022.

Honours
Partizan
 Handball League of Serbia: 2010–11, 2011–12
SG Flensburg-Handewitt
 DHB-Pokal: 2014–15
 DHB-Supercup: 2013
 EHF Champions League: 2013–14
Rhein-Neckar Löwen
 DHB-Pokal: 2017–18
 DHB-Supercup: 2017, 2018

References

External links

1993 births
Living people
People from Smederevska Palanka
Serbian male handball players
RK Partizan players
SG Flensburg-Handewitt players
Rhein-Neckar Löwen players
SC Pick Szeged players
Handball-Bundesliga players
Expatriate handball players
Serbian expatriate sportspeople in Germany
Serbian expatriate sportspeople in Hungary